The E.414 is a class of electric locomotives operated by Trenitalia. They were built in 1994–1996, in a total of 60 units, as the E.404 class used in pairs in the ETR 500 high-speed trains. Starting from 2007, they were refurbished to be used, in double units, to haul Frecciabianca prestige trains.

E.414
Bo′Bo′ locomotives
3000 V DC locomotives
Railway locomotives introduced in 1994
Standard gauge locomotives of Italy

Passenger locomotives